The women's 3000 metres in speed skating at the 1964 Winter Olympics took place on 2 February, at the Eisschnellaufbahn.

Records
Prior to this competition, the existing world and Olympic records were as follows:

Results

References

Women's speed skating at the 1964 Winter Olympics
Olymp
Skat